Australian Aircraft & Engineering Co. Ltd. was formed in 1919 by N.B. Love, W.J. Warneford and H.E. Broadsmith. The company was registered in Sydney on 1 October 1919 with capital of £50,000 with the intention of manufacturing aircraft in Australia.

Flying
The company began flying operations at Sydney Airport on 9 January 1920 following the delivery of 20 Avro 504K aircraft on the ship SS Commonwealth.

Engineering
They fitted a Sunbeam Dyak engine to the first Qantas aircraft to replace the original Gnome rotary engine.

Agency
The company secured the Australian agency for Avro aircraft, assembling a number of Avro 504K aircraft. The Broadsmith-designed Broadsmith B.1 (as AA & E Commercial B1) was also built by the company. This aircraft was a 6-seat biplane.

Bankruptcy
The company went bankrupt in 1922 whilst building six 504Ks for the Royal Australian Air Force, and went into liquidation in March 1923.

References

Defunct aircraft manufacturers of Australia
Manufacturing companies based in Sydney
Manufacturing companies established in 1919
Manufacturing companies disestablished in 1923
Australian companies established in 1919
1923 disestablishments in Australia